Sir Thomas Milvain   (4 May 1844 – 13 September 1916) was an English lawyer and Conservative Party politician.

Background and Career
Milvain was the son of Henry Milvain of North Elswick Hall, Newcastle upon Tyne and his wife Jane Davidson, and was educated at Durham School and Trinity Hall, Cambridge, where he graduated with an LL.B. in 1866 and LL.M. in 1872. He was called to the bar at Middle Temple in 1869, and practiced on the North-Eastern Circuit. 

In 1885 Milvain was elected Member of Parliament for Durham. He took silk in 1888, and after losing his parliament seat in 1892 was appointed Recorder of Bradford and Chancellor of the County Palatine of Durham. The following year, he was appointed a Bencher at Middle Temple.

He stood unsuccessfully in Cockermouth, Cumberland, in 1895, and in Maidstone at a by-election in 1901. The same year, he served as Chairman of the South African Compensation Commission. He was then elected MP for Hampstead at a by-election in January 1902.

Milvain gave up the seat in 1905 when he was appointed Judge Advocate General, a position that he held until his death in 1916. He was succeeded by Felix Cassel who had served as his deputy. In 1912, Milvain was appointed a Companion of the Order of the Bath and was knighted.

Personal life
Milvain was an athletics blue in hurdles and won the National Championship over 120 yards hurdles in 1866.

He married Mary Alice Henderson on 28 January 1875, daughter of John Henderson, and they had one son, Colonel Henry Roland Milvain (1880-1960). He died at his house, Eglingham Hall, Alnwick, Northumberland on 23 September 1916 (aged 73).

References

External links 
 

1844 births
1916 deaths
Conservative Party (UK) MPs for English constituencies
UK MPs 1885–1886
UK MPs 1886–1892
UK MPs 1900–1906
20th-century English judges
Members of the Middle Temple
Alumni of Trinity Hall, Cambridge
English King's Counsel
Members of the Parliament of the United Kingdom for City of Durham

People educated at Durham School
Companions of the Order of the Bath